Julian Weigel (born 14 July 2001) is a German professional footballer who plays as a midfielder for 1. FC Lokomotive Leipzig.

Career statistics

References

2001 births
Living people
German footballers
Association football midfielders
3. Liga players
Regionalliga players
FC Rot-Weiß Erfurt players
1. FC Magdeburg players
VfB Germania Halberstadt players
1. FC Lokomotive Leipzig players